Yoo Nam-seok (born 1 May 1957) is the 7th President of the Constitutional Court of Korea.

Early life 
Born in Mokpo, Jeonnam Province of South Korea, Yoo Nam-seok graduated from Seoul National University college of law. He passed the 23rd  in 1981 and completed the Judicial Research and Training Institute in 1983 to be a judge.

He expressed his view that conscientious objectors should be allowed to be granted the opportunity for alternative military service instead of being punished on his paper titled ‘Legal Review on Conscientious Objectors’ during his military service as an army legal officer in 1985.

He was appointed as Constitutional Court Justice directly by President of South Korea Moon Jae-in on October 19, 2017, and sworn in on November 13, 2017.

The National Assembly passed a bill to appoint him as the President of the Constitutional Court on September 20, 2018, and President Moon appointed him to the presidency the next day.

Career 
 1986: Judge, 
 1993: Seconded as Rapporteur Judge to the Constitutional Court of Korea
 1994: Judge, 
 1996: Research Judge, Supreme Court of Korea
 2002: Senior Judge,  and Director of Judicial Policy, 
 2003: Senior Judge, 
 2005: Senior Judge, 
 2008: Seconded as Rapporteur Judge to the Constitutional Court of Korea
 2010: Senior Judge, Seoul High Court
 2012: Chief Judge, 
 2016: Chief Judge, 
 2017: Justice of the Constitutional Court of Korea
 2018: President of the Constitutional Court of Korea

References

External links 

|-

Living people
1957 births
South Korean judges
Justices of the Constitutional Court of Korea
Presidents of the Constitutional Court of Korea
Seoul National University School of Law alumni